Circaea × intermedia is a hybrid of flowering plants in the evening primrose family Onagraceae. The parents of the hybrid are Circaea alpina and Circaea lutetiana.

References

intermedia
Plant nothospecies